The canton of Saint-Simon is a former administrative division in northern France. It was disbanded following the French canton reorganisation which came into effect in March 2015. It had 11,852 inhabitants (2012).

The canton comprised the following communes:

Annois
Artemps
Aubigny-aux-Kaisnes
Bray-Saint-Christophe
Castres
Clastres
Contescourt
Cugny
Dallon
Dury
Flavy-le-Martel
Fontaine-lès-Clercs
Grugies
Happencourt
Jussy
Montescourt-Lizerolles
Ollezy
Pithon
Saint-Simon
Seraucourt-le-Grand
Sommette-Eaucourt
Tugny-et-Pont
Villers-Saint-Christophe

Demographics

See also
Cantons of the Aisne department

References

Former cantons of Aisne
2015 disestablishments in France
States and territories disestablished in 2015